Rap-Sodia Efectului Defectului (English: A Rap-sody for the Shortcoming's Consequence) is the debut studio album from the hip hop group R.A.C.L.A. and the first Romanian hip hop album.

Track listing
Intro
"Probleme majore"
"Jungla din stradă"
"Nu mai vrem să răbdați"
"Moțiune de cenzură"
"Război = orori și crimă"
"Vis ucigaș"
"Efectul defectului"
"Hip-Hop ura"
"Stil rău"
"Canalu' lu' Neluțu"
"Mahala"
"Pentru paray"
Outro

References

1995 albums
R.A.C.L.A. albums